Rogne is a village in Øystre Slidre Municipality in Innlandet county, Norway. The village is located on the eastern shore of a large lake called the Volbufjorden, a short distance to the southeast of the villages of Heggenes, Moane, and Volbu. The village is the site of a local school as well as the Rogne Church.

Just east of Rogne is a large slate quarry, that has been operating for over 250 years. A sculpture memorial was built in Rogne by the sculptor Gunnar Rørhus for the purpose of honoring all the slate workers who have lived in the village over the centuries.

References

Øystre Slidre
Villages in Innlandet